Robertus "Rob" Johannes Druppers (born 29 April 1962) is a former Dutch middle distance runner, who won the silver medal in the 800 m event at the 1983 World Championships. He set a Dutch 800 m record at 1:43.56 in Cologne in 1985, and a 1000 m record of 2:15.23 in his home town Utrecht in the same year. Druppers competed at the 1988 Summer Olympics, where he was eliminated in the quarterfinals of the 800 m.

Competition record

DNF = did not finish

Personal bests
Outdoor
800 metres – 1:43.56 (Cologne 1985)
1000 metres – 2:15.23 (Utrecht 1985)
1500 metres – 3:35.07 (1985)
Indoor
800 metres – 1:46.29 (Stuttgart 1987)
1000 metres – 2:16.4 (The Hague 1988)

References

External links

1962 births
Living people
Sportspeople from Utrecht (city)
Dutch male middle-distance runners
Olympic male middle-distance runners
Olympic athletes of the Netherlands
Athletes (track and field) at the 1988 Summer Olympics
World Athletics Championships athletes for the Netherlands
World Athletics Championships medalists
Japan Championships in Athletics winners
20th-century Dutch people
21st-century Dutch people